Crawick Multiverse is a land art project by the landscape architect and designer Charles Jencks near Sanquhar, Dumfries and Galloway. It opened to the public on 21 June 2015. The project is located on the site of a former open cast coal mine and covers approximately 55 acres, making it the largest of Jencks's works in Britain. Nine 'landforms' make up the Crawick Multiverse. Like Jencks's other work, including the nearby Garden of Cosmic Speculation, these represent ideas from modern cosmology. Unlike the Garden of Cosmic Speculation, the Crawick Multiverse landforms use stone, in the style of the megalithic monuments. These include the 'North-South Line', a 400 meter long stone avenue flanked by over 300 boulders, and two stone circles on top of mounds representing the Milky Way and Andromeda galaxies. In total, over 2000 boulders have been used in the project. Jencks has described it as "A cosmic landscape worthy of the ancients."

See also
 Holm House and the Crawick Glen

References

External links

The statue got me high. A critical reflection on the Crawick Multiverse by The Urban Prehistorian
Video and commentary on the Crawick Multiverse
Video and commentary on the associated bings at Gateside

Gardens in Dumfries and Galloway
Sculpture gardens, trails and parks in the United Kingdom
Land art
Sanquhar